PUNE tc is a Hindi romantic comedy film directed by Abhijeet Choudhary
(Director & Founder of Swatantra Theatre, Pune). The movie is produced under Zoya & Saara Films. Eros International acquired the overseas rights of the film.

Plot 
Venkateshwarlu had spent his childhood and grew up at a small village near Tirupati. One day he decides to move to Mumbai. His friend instead convinces him to go to Pune. However, against his family's wish, finally he lands up at Pune. As he tries to make himself comfortable and settle down, slowly and gradually he finds himself entangled with Sonika, Sudha, Ananya, Disha & Dhriti who stay in the same bungalow.
Sonika works at a call centre and is a fun loving girl. Ananya an investment banker is quite sure about what she wants in her life. Sudha a software engineer is desperately looking for a suitable match for her elder sister. Disha and Dhriti are daughters of the landlord and are ready to invite some love in their life.
The film takes an interesting turn as Venky becomes the centre of attraction and starts making a comfortable seat in everyone's heart! Love and Chaos takes over.

Cast

 Shaik Riyaz as Venkateshwarlu
 Dhanashree Heblikar as Disha
 Abhijeet Choudhary as Aasim Khan
 Ridhima Pathaka as Sonika
 Sulagna as Ananya
 Bhakti Ratnaparkhi as Sudha
 Ayub Khan as Hemang Patil
 Zameer Khan as Iqbal
 Prerna Mahajan as Dhriti
 Yuwaraj Shah as Father of Disha & Dhirti

Soundtrack
PUNE TC music album launched on 6 January 2012.
Within the few days of music release of PUNE tc, the songs were on the top 10 list in MP3 Hungama and Dhingana.

References 

 http://www.indianexpress.com/news/takingcare/544493/
 http://www.swatantratheater.com/html/swatantra-director.html/abhijeetchoudhary_debut_film.html
 http://epaper.timesofindia.com/Repository/ml.asp?Ref=VE9JUFUvMjAxMC8wMy8yMCNBcjAyMzAx
 https://web.archive.org/web/20120207203736/http://swatantratheatre.com/html/45/swatantra-director.html
 https://www.imdb.com/company/co0050176/

External links 
 https://web.archive.org/web/20130702002454/http://swatantratheatre.com/html/news_02032012_1.html
 http://www.indianexpress.com/news/takingcare/544493/
 http://epaper.timesofindia.com/Repository/ml.asp?Ref=VE9JUFUvMjAxMC8wMy8yMCNBcjAyMzAx
 
 https://web.archive.org/web/20120426072832/http://apertureindia.com/index.php/media/audio
 http://www.expressindia.com/latest-news/diva-nite/897381/
 http://mp3hungama.com/music/index.php?action=top&show=10&type=Songs
 http://www.dhingana.com/pune-tc/movie/songs/hindi/latest/31600
 http://www.eraag.com
 https://www.imdb.com/company/co0050176/
 http://in.bookmyshow.com/movies/Pune-tc-(Hindi)-U/ET00009080

2010s Hindi-language films